Jameela may refer to:
 Jameela (butterfly genus)
 Jameela Jamil
 Mulan Jameela
 Nalini Jameela